Tony Wheeler (born January 19, 1975) is an American former sprinter.

References

1975 births
Living people
American male sprinters
Universiade medalists in athletics (track and field)
Universiade gold medalists for the United States
Medalists at the 1997 Summer Universiade